Villa Hidalgo (also, Santa Rita) is a village in Zacatecas, Mexico.

See also
Villa Hidalgo, Zacatecas

References

Populated places in Zacatecas